Yūsuf ibn ʾAḥmad (1695–1772) was a Bahraini theologian and a key figure in the intellectual development of Twelver Shia Islam.

Yusuf grew up in Safavid-ruled Bahrain, at a time of intellectual ferment between Akhbari and Usuli Shi'ah Islam. His family were Usuli clerics who also worked as pearl merchants. The 1717 Omani invasion of Bahrain forced him and his family to flee, first to Qatif, then to Mecca and then Shiraz, before he eventually settled in Karbala. In Karbala he became the prestigious dean of the Shi'i scholarship and as such presided over the religious establishment.

Yusuf adopted the Akbhari school, rejecting his early Usuli schooling in Bahrain. Yusuf's thought evolved from a strict Akhbarism to a position that adopted some Usuli elements; he became his generation's chief proponent of the neo-Akhbari creed.  Nevertheless, he rejected Usuli principles of legal reasoning, the syllogistic logic Usulis allowed in interpreting the law, and the legitimacy of holy war during the Occultation of the Imam. Historian Juan Cole summarises al-Bahrani's thought as: It has been proposed by that Yusuf may have found the state-centric Usulism less appealing given the political turmoil he had experienced throughout his life: first as a refugee from his homeland and then again when the Safavids were deposed by Afghan invaders.

Cole gives three reasons for the triumph of Akhbarism in Bahrain over the Usulis: the invasions of Bahrain and Safavid Iran by Omanis and Afghans respectively, which undermined the state centric Usulism; a generational gap that appeared at the end of the seventeenth century in strict Usuli families with sons disappointed at the Usuli clerics' failure to meet the Omani and Afghan challenges; and geographical divisions emerged between Diraz where Yusuf's influence was strongest and the old Safavid Usuli centre of Bilad Al Qadeem.

In Karbala, Yusuf and his followers continued the intellectual debate with Usulism that has spurred Bahrain's intellectual vitality.  Under al-Bahrani's influence Karbala was dominated by Arab ulema-merchants, although the first Usuli cell was founded by Iranian cleric Muhammad Baqir Behbahani in the 1760s. Behbahani gradually became more confident, and with a growing number of students as well as wealth from relatives in Iran and India, he began to challenge al-Bahrani, eventually succeeding him as the dominant intellectual in Karbala when al-Bahrani died in 1772.

Yusuf edited numerous books, including Lu’lu’at al-Baḥrayn "The Pearl of Bahrain", a biographical dictionary of Shia scholars, the last chapter of which was his autobiography.

See also
Usfurids
History of Bahrain
Maitham Al Bahrani
Salih Al-Karzakani
Abdullah al Samahiji

References

Rival Empires of Trade and Imami Shiism in Eastern Arabia, 1300-1800, Juan Cole, International Journal of Middle East Studies, Vol. 19, No. 2, (May, 1987), pp. 177–203

External links
  An Account of the Life of the Author and the Events That Have Befallen Him, Autobiography of Yūsuf al-Bahrānī (1696–1772) from Lu’lu’at al-Baḥrayn, featured in Interpreting the Self, Autobiography in the Arabic Literary Tradition, Edited by Dwight F. Reynolds, University of California Press Berkeley 2001

Bahraini Shia clerics
Twelvers
Karbala
Bahraini Shia Muslims
Bahraini ayatollahs
1772 deaths
1695 births